Boy Lake is a lake in Cass County, Minnesota, in the United States.

Boy Lake was named in commemoration of Ojibwe boys who were killed there in a battle against the Sioux.

See also
List of lakes in Minnesota

References

Lakes of Minnesota
Lakes of Cass County, Minnesota